Forrest Wesley Young (April 10, 1940 – 2006) is a professor emeritus of quantitative psychology at the University of North Carolina and former President of the Psychometric Society. He is known for his contributions to multidimensional scaling. He is the developer of ViSta a software for data visualization.

Books

Schiffman, S.S., Reynolds, M.L. & Young, F.W. (1981). Introduction to Multidimensional Scaling. New York: Academic Press.
Young, F.W. & Sarle, W.S. (1982). Exploratory Multivariate Data Analysis. Cary, NC: SAS Institute, Inc.
Young, F.W. & Hamer, R.M. (1987). Multidimensional Scaling: History, Theory and Applications. New York: Erlbaum Associates. (reprinted, 1994)

References

1940 births
Psychometricians
University of North Carolina faculty
American writers
2006 deaths